Mordellaria binotata is a species of beetle in the genus Mordellaria of the family Mordellidae. It was described in 1995.

References

Beetles described in 1995
Mordellidae